The following is a list of Law & Order episodes from the series' thirteenth season (2002–2003):

Cast

Arthur Branch (played by Fred Dalton Thompson) replaced season 12's Nora Lewin  (Dianne Wiest) in the role of District Attorney.  The resulting ensemble cast was the most stable in the history of the Law & Order series up to that time, being unchanged for 2 seasons over 48 episodes. The longest period of cast stability overall encompassed the last four episodes of Season 18 and the entirety of Seasons 19 and 20, a total of 49 episodes.

Main
 Jerry Orbach as Senior Detective Lennie Briscoe
 Jesse L. Martin as Junior Detective Ed Green
 S. Epatha Merkerson as Lieutenant Anita Van Buren
 Sam Waterston as Executive Assistant District Attorney Jack McCoy
 Elisabeth Röhm as Assistant District Attorney Serena Southerlyn
 Fred Dalton Thompson as District Attorney Arthur Branch

Recurring

 Carolyn McCormick as Dr. Elizabeth Olivet
 J. K. Simmons as Dr. Emil Skoda

Episodes

References

Notes

 Fred Dalton Thompson joins the cast as Arthur Branch in this season.
 The episode "Couples" marks the show's 300th episode.
 The episode "Under God" revisit season 8 episode "Damaged" when Briscoe recalls the tragic loss of his daughter Cathy.

External links
 Episode guide from NBC.com

13
2002 American television seasons
2003 American television seasons